Zuid may refer to:

Zuid (Antwerp), Netherlands
Zuid (Middelburg), Netherlands
Zuid, Suriname, a resort in the Para District